Admiral Inglis may refer to:

Charles Inglis (Royal Navy officer, died 1791) (c. 1731–1791), British Royal Navy rear admiral
John Inglis (Royal Navy officer) (1743–1807), British Royal Navy vice admiral
John Gilchrist Inglis (1906–1972), British Royal Navy vice admiral

See also
Charles Ingles (1869–1954), British Royal Navy Chaplain of the Fleet (equivalent to admiral rank)